

The CAMS 30E was a two-seat flying boat trainer built in France in the early 1920s.  It was the first aircraft designed for CAMS by Raffaele Conflenti after he had been recruited by the company from his previous job at Società Idrovolanti Alta Italia (SIAI).  It was a conventional design for the era featuring a two-bay equal-span unstaggered biplane wing cellule.  The prototype was exhibited at the 1922 Salon de l'Aéronautique and evaluated the following year by the Aéronautique Maritime.  The type's favourable performance led to an order of 22 machines for the French military and an export order of seven for Yugoslavia and four for Poland.

A single civil example was produced as the CAMS 30T with two extra passenger seats.  In August 1924, Ernest Burri used this machine to break the world air speed record for a passenger-carrying seaplane.

Variants
 CAMS 30E - Production military flying-boat trainer.
 CAMS 30T - Passenger version of the CAMS30E with two extra seats.

Operators

 Aeronautique Maritime

 Yugoslav Royal Navy

Specifications (30E)

References

Bibliography

 
 

1920s French military trainer aircraft
Flying boats
30E
Single-engined pusher aircraft
Biplanes
Aircraft first flown in 1922